Kurmakash is a river in Perm Krai, Russia, a right tributary of the Syp River, which in turn is a tributary of the Iren River.

References 

Rivers of Perm Krai